N. maculata may refer to:

 Nabalua maculata, a Southeast Asian cicada
 Narcine maculata, an electric ray
 Nausithoe maculata, a crown jellyfish
 Naxidia maculata, a geometer moth
 Nemophila maculata, a plant endemic to California
 Neoregelia maculata, a plant endemic to Brazil
 Neotinea maculata, an Old World orchid
 Nepanthia maculata, an eastern Pacific starfish
 Nephila maculata, a golden orb-web spider
 Nerita maculata, a sea snail
 Nervilia maculata, a flowering plant
 Ninia maculata, a coffee snake
 Noctua maculata, an owlet moth
 Nola maculata, an Asian moth
 Nomada maculata, a cuckoo bee
 Notocelis maculata, an invertebrate animal
 Notonecta maculata, a British backswimmer
 Nyctemera maculata, an Indonesian moth
 Nymphaea maculata, a water lily